Acrocercops chrysophylli is a moth of the family Gracillariidae. It is known from South Africa and Zimbabwe.

The larvae feed on Chrysophyllum gorungosanum. They mine the leaves of their host plant. The mine has the form of a moderate, irregular, pale ochreous, transparent blotch-mine, with a long, narrow, epidermal gallery on the upperside of the leaf.

References

chrysophylli
Moths of Sub-Saharan Africa
Moths described in 1961
Lepidoptera of Zimbabwe
Lepidoptera of South Africa